"Laissez-nous respirer" is a song by French singer Ilona Mitrecey from her second album Laissez-nous respirer. It was the album's opening track and it was released as its first single. The single came out simultaneously with the album in December 2006 and debuted at number 20 in France, then peaking at number 16 for two weeks.

Charts

References 

2006 songs
2006 singles
Ilona Mitrecey songs
Universal Music Group singles